John Mountstephen, also known as John Mountsteven, (28 April 1644 – 19 December 1706) was a Member of Parliament for the Cornish constituency of West Looe until he committed suicide in December 1706 following the disclosure he was an informer selling state secrets to the French.

Family
Mountstephen was the second son of John Mountsteven and Elizabeth (née Tamlyn) of St Mabyn, Cornwall. He was educated at Bodmin school and Christ Church, Oxford. Mountstephen purchased the barton of Lancarffe (Helland) in 1685 from the Bullock family while secretary to the Earl of Sutherland. His brother, William inherited Lancarffe, after a jury returned a verdict of lunacy following John's suicide.

Career
He was sponsored by the Robert Spencer, 2nd Earl of Sunderland for eighteen years, for whom he served as an under-secretary. On 19 December 1706, Mountstephen was at Brown's Coffee House, King Street, Westminster in the company of other MPs when he took out a razor from his pocket and slit his throat. His suicide was probably because it became public about his passing of state secrets to the King of France, in return for a pension, although there were rumours that he took his life after his proposal of marriage was rejected by someone of higher social standing.

References

1644 births
1706 deaths
Alumni of Christ Church, Oxford
British politicians who committed suicide
English MPs 1685–1687
English MPs 1695–1698
English MPs 1698–1700
English MPs 1701
English MPs 1705–1707
Looe
Members of the pre-1707 English Parliament for constituencies in Cornwall
People from Cornwall
Suicides by sharp instrument in England
Suicides in Westminster
18th-century suicides